Adriatic Croatia International Club, commonly referred to as ACI Club or simply ACI, is a Croatian nautical tourism company based in Opatija which operates a marina chain along the Croatian part of the Adriatic coast. From the initial 16 marinas opened in 1986 they expanded to 22 in 2016, which makes it the largest chain of marinas in the Mediterranean as of 2022. ACI is also known for organizing the annual match racing sailing regatta called the "ACI Match Race Cup", first held in 1987.

History
ACI was originally established on 1 July 1983 as a state-owned company with the aim of promoting nautical tourism. It was originally called Adriatic Club Yugoslavia (ACY), which was changed in 1991 to Adriatic Yacht Club (due to the breakup of Yugoslavia and Croatia's independence), although they continued using the ACY shortname. In June 1994, after it underwent privatization, the company was re-established as a joint-stock company, adopted its current name and changed their shortname to ACI Club accordingly.

ACI is also the biggest single member of the Croatian Association of Marinas, the national trade association of around 50 individual marinas operating in Croatian waters, meaning that ACI controls nearly half of all marinas in the country. The company's shares are listed on the Zagreb Stock Exchange (ZSE), although a 79% majority stake is held by the Republic of Croatia, more precisely Ministry of Construction, Spatial Planning and State Property as of January 2022.

Marinas
The company's initial 16 marinas were built between 1982 and 1985 and opened for visitors in the summer of 1986. The marinas in Korčula and Opatija followed and opened in 1989 and 1990. In January 1991 the independently operated Dubrovnik marina was integrated into the company's network and in 1994 marinas at Cres and Šimuni were added. In July 2016 the newest ACI marina opened in Slano, named by ACI's founder Veljko Barbieri. The company thus operates a total of 22 marinas as of 2016, making it the largest single marina chain in the entire Mediterranean. Out of the 22 marinas 18 are open year-round while the remaining four (Palmižana, Piškera, Rab and Žut) operate during summer months only. The northernmost marina is in Umag while the southernmost is in Dubrovnik.

The following is the complete list of ACI marinas:

Match race cup
ACI also organizes the annual match racing sailing event called "ACI Match Race Cup". First held in 1987, it usually takes place in the waters near Rovinj or Split. Race results are counted towards the International Sailing Federation World Rankings. Irish skipper Harold Cudmore won the inaugural event in 1987, and Australian Peter Gilmour has most wins overall, winning the event five times (in 1993, 1994, 1995, 1997 and 2005).

The following is the complete list of winning skippers:

References

External links

List of ACI marinas at About-Croatia.com

Companies established in 1983
Companies listed on the Zagreb Stock Exchange
Marinas in Croatia
1983 establishments in Yugoslavia
1983 establishments in Croatia
Government-owned companies of Croatia